Homalothecium sericeum is a species of moss belonging to the family Brachytheciaceae.

It has almost cosmopolitan distribution.

References

Hypnales